The Fun of Your Love is the debut studio album by American country music singer Jennifer Day. It was released by BNA Records in 2000.

Track listing

Track information and credits verified from the album's liner notes.

Charts

Singles

Musicians
Jennifer Day: lead vocals
Shannon Forrest: drums
Jimmy Carter: bass
Brent Mason, Kelly Back, Steve Mandile: electric guitar
Biff Watson, Robert Byrne, B James Lowry: acoustic guitar
Paul Franklin: lap steel guitar, steel guitar, sitar
Scotty Sanders: steel guitar
B James Lowry: gut string guitar
Aubrey Haynie: mandolin, fiddle
Stave Nathan: synthesizer, B-3 organ, keyboards, piano
Robert Byrne, Shannon Forrest: tambourine
D. Bergen White: arranger/conductor
Carl Gorodetsky: Contractor
Tom McAninch: Copyist
Carl Gorodetsky, Cate Myer, Alan Umstead, Lee Harrison, David B. Angell, David H. Davidson, Catherine Umstead, Conni Ellisor, Mary K. Vanosdale, Karen E. Winklemann: violins
Monisa P. Angell, Richard J. Grosjean, Kristen Wilkerson, Gary Vanosdale: viola
Anthony La Marchina, Bob Mason: cello
Dillon Dixon, Beth Nielson Chapman, Wes Hightower, Marty Slayton, Carolyn Dawn Johnson, Julie Wood, Kennifer Kimball, Tommy Lee James, Jennifer Day, Annie Roboff: background vocals

Production
Robert Byrne: Producer
Steve Lowery: Recorder, mixer
Robert Byrne, Shawn Simpson, Patrick Murphy, Steve Crowder, Dave Matthews, Fred Paragano: additional recording
John Skinner: tracking engineering assistance
Hank Williams: master

References

2000 debut albums
BNA Records albums
Albums produced by Robert Byrne (songwriter)